Linda Oubré is the president of Whittier College and a professor of business administration at the college.

Early life and education 
Oubré grew up in Los Angeles and was a first-generation college student whose grandparents did not finish elementary school, but were labor and civil rights activists. She graduated from Hollywood High School, and earned a B.A. in economics from the University of California, Los Angeles in 1980. After college she worked for a commercial bank before earning an MBA from Harvard Business School in 1984, and an Ed.D. in higher education management from the University of Pennsylvania.

Career 
After Oubré graduated from Harvard Business School she worked in the admissions department. She was a founder of BriteSmile, and worked with the company from 1998 until 2002, including serving as president of the company when it went public on NASDAQ. She has worked in multiple companies including Tri Com Ventures, Times Mirror Company, Syncom Capital, and the Walt Disney Company. In 2003, Oubré was an executive in residence at the University of California, Davis, and she returned in 2011 to work in corporate relations, business development, and was the chief diversity officer for the Graduate School of Management. In 2012, Oubré moved to San Francisco State University where she was the Dean of the College of Business. In 2018, Oubré was named president of Whittier College. She is the first African-American and the third female to serve as president of the college.

Oubré's presidency at Whittier College has been criticized as using fear, intimidation and legal threats to silence critics. Concerns initially surrounded Oubré's November 2022 mid-season announcement of the elimination of football, lacrosse, and the men's and women's golf programs from the college which plagiarized text from a 2019 Forbes article.  Concerns about college enrollment, nepotism in hiring, qualifications of senior administrators, and hostility towards critics became more pressing.  Alumni and community partners have written open letters to Oubré outlining concerns and asking questions. Prior to her 2023 "State of the College" address, Oubré indicated that the address would be virtual due to safety concerns on campus and going further in March 2023 to indicate that she had received racialized death threats. California Public Records Act requests to the City of Whittier, Whittier Police Department and the Los Angeles County Sheriff's office indicate no such threats had been made.

Board Memberships 
Oubré joined several boards since her inauguration as president of Whittier College. In 2019 she was named to the board of directors for the College Futures Foundation, where she was paid $4000 for her board attendance in 2019 and $16000 in 2020. Oubré also joined the Weingart Foundation board during 2019-20, alongside Miguel Santana, where Oubré received remuneration of $30,750 for her position.

Honors and awards 
Oubré was named a “Forever influential woman in business” by the San Francisco Business Times and received the Trailblazer Award from the San Francisco chapter of the Council of 100 Black Women.

References 

Whittier College faculty
Heads of universities and colleges in the United States
University of California, Los Angeles alumni
Harvard Business School alumni
University of Pennsylvania alumni

Year of birth missing (living people)
Living people